The Garvellachs (Scottish Gaelic: Garbh Eileaich) or Isles of the Sea form a small archipelago in the Inner Hebrides of Scotland. Part of the Argyll and Bute council area, they lie west of Lunga and northwest of Scarba and have been uninhabited since World War II.

The islands include Garbh Eileach, Dùn Chonnuill and Eileach an Naoimh.

Overview
The waters surrounding the islands are extensively used for leisure sailing.  A good knowledge of the area is required, with weather conditions likely to change very quickly.  Due to the array of separate tidal races produced by the underwater topography there are some treacherous stretches of water.  These include the Grey Dogs between Scarba and Lunga and the Gulf of Corryvreckan, between Scarba and Jura in which is located the infamous Corryvreckan whirlpool, which is the third-largest whirlpool in the world.

The area is part of the Scarba, Lunga and the Garvellachs National Scenic Area, one of 40 such areas in Scotlands, which are defined so as to identify areas of exceptional scenery and to ensure its protection by restricting certain forms of development. The Scottish plant collector, Clara Winsome Muirhead surveyed the plant life of the islands and published The Flora of  Easdale and the Garvellachs in 1962.

Gallery

See also

 List of islands of Scotland

Notes

External links

Uninhabited islands of Argyll and Bute
National scenic areas of Scotland
Sites of Special Scientific Interest in Islay and Jura
Protected areas of Argyll and Bute
Archipelagoes of Scotland